Darwin Doronis Bonilla Salgado (born August 6, 1990 in Chirilagua, El Salvador) is a former Salvadoran footballer. He was banned for life in 2013, for match-fixing while playing for the El Salvador national football team.

Club career
Bonilla's professional career began in July 2008 when he signed a contract with Salvadoran national league club, C.D. Águila, after he had already joined them 2 years earlier from Dragón.

He made his professional debut on September 13, 2008, in a league match against C.D. Vista Hermosa, and scored his first goal on November 5 that same year in a league match against C.D. Luis Ángel Firpo.

On September 20, 2013, Bonilla was one of 14 Salvadoran players banned for life due to their involvement with match fixing.

Career statistics

Club
As of December 25, 2008.

References

1990 births
Living people
People from San Miguel Department (El Salvador)
Association football midfielders
Salvadoran footballers
C.D. Águila footballers
El Salvador international footballers
2013 Copa Centroamericana players
2013 CONCACAF Gold Cup players
Sportspeople involved in betting scandals
Sportspeople banned for life